Arie van Wetten (26 September 1934 – 1 October 2013) was a Dutch racing cyclist. He rode in the 1957 Tour de France.

References

1934 births
2013 deaths
Dutch male cyclists
Place of birth missing